The 2015 Arena Football League season was the 28th season in the history of the league. The regular season began on March 27, 2015 and ended on August 8, 2015.

League business

Teams
The city of Las Vegas, Nevada was awarded an expansion team on June 18, 2014. The team, named the Las Vegas Outlaws, was the first AFL team to call Las Vegas home since the Las Vegas Gladiators in 2007. Vince Neil, lead singer of the rock band Mötley Crüe, was the majority owner of the expansion franchise. The Outlaws' expansion draft took place on December 22, 2014.

Two teams that competed in 2014 suspended operations (Pittsburgh Power and San Antonio Talons), and their rosters became signable upon offseason assignment process held on December 23, 2014.

The Iowa Barnstormers were the third and final team to leave the AFL for the 2015 season when they joined the Indoor Football League (IFL) on August 27, 2014. In 2015 all games were televised, most on ESPN, ESPN2, ESPNEWS, and especially on ESPN3 (available online through WatchESPN) and some on the CBS Sports Network.

On July 15, the league took over the daily operations of the Las Vegas Outlaws and New Orleans VooDoo after financial problems and declining attendance. As a result, their game against each other (which was set to be played on the 25th) was cancelled and declared a tie, only the 3rd in AFL history and the only cancellation in league history. The league ran both teams to the end of the season with the intent of looking for new ownership in the offseason but on August 9, the day following the conclusion of the regular season, both teams ceased operations. Las Vegas had qualified for a playoff spot, the final one in the National Conference, but the league's Board of Directors voted against their inclusion in the postseason, considering that with no team ownership, there was no funding for the team.  The Outlaws were replaced in the playoffs by the Portland Thunder, who had finished last in their division but had the better record of the two remaining non-playoff National Conference teams, meaning that all teams in the Pacific Division made the playoffs.

Alignment

Regular season standings

Playoffs

Conference semifinals

Conference finals

ArenaBowl XXVIII

All-Arena team

References